Diya Siddique (born 19 February 2004) is a Bangladeshi archer. On 23 May 2021, she along with Ruman Shana claimed silver medal in the recurve mixed team event during the 2021 Archery World Cup where Bangladesh emerged as runners-up to Netherlands in the final. Despite losing the final 5–1, it was the best performance by Bangladesh at an Archery World Championship. It also marked the first instance whereas Bangladesh managed to reach final in an event of Archery World Cup.

References

External links
 
 Diya Siddique at the World Archery Federation

Bangladeshi female archers
Living people
World Archery Championships medalists
2004 births
Olympic archers of Bangladesh
Archers at the 2020 Summer Olympics
21st-century Bangladeshi women
Islamic Solidarity Games medalists in archery